The 2013 Big West Conference men's basketball tournament took place March 14–16, 2013 at the Honda Center in Anaheim, California. The Tournament was previously held at the Anaheim Convention Center. The winner of the tournament received the conference's automatic bid to the 2013 NCAA Men's Division I Basketball Tournament.

Format
The top eight teams qualified for the 2013 Big West tournament. In the Semifinals the highest seed played the lowest seed, while the remaining two teams matched up.  UC Riverside was ineligible for postseason play, and did not compete in the tournament.
Cal State Northridge finished 9th so they didn't qualify to play in the Big West tournament.

Bracket

All times listed are Pacific

References

Big West Conference men's basketball tournament
2012–13 Big West Conference men's basketball season
Big West Conference men's basketball tournament
Big West Conference men's basketball tournament